John Blue House, also known as "Blue House," was a historic home located at Aberdeen, Moore County, North Carolina. It was built in 1888, and was a two-story, Colonial Revival style frame dwelling.  It featured a grand tetrastyle portico supported by Doric order columns added in 1903.  It was built by John Blue, founder of the Aberdeen and Rockfish Railroad.  It has been demolished.

It was added to the National Register of Historic Places in 1982.

References

Houses on the National Register of Historic Places in North Carolina
Colonial Revival architecture in North Carolina
Houses completed in 1888
Houses in Moore County, North Carolina
National Register of Historic Places in Moore County, North Carolina
Individually listed contributing properties to historic districts on the National Register in North Carolina